SMSN H.S.S or Sathragraha Memorial Srinarayana Higher Secondary School Vaikom is situated in Kottayam district, Kerala.
It is managed by SNDP vaikom union. In the memory of great guru Sri Narayana Guru Lead in the Vaikom SatyagrahaTemple Entry Proclamationvaikom 1924–25.
The same school is also called Asramam school. Many great leaders like Gandhiji, TK Madhavan, etc.  visited  this school at the event of vaikom sathyagraha.

References

 Extreme injustice led to Vaikom Satyagraha, says Romila Thapar
 http://www.modernrationalist.com/2011/january/page06.html

Schools in Kottayam district
Vaikom